Herbarius moguntinus (Mainzer Herbal Book) or (according to his preface referred to as) Aggregator practicus de simplicibus is an illustrated Latin herbal which was edited and printed in 1484 by Peter Schöffer in Mainz (Latin: moguntia). Together with the German herbal Gart der Gesundheit (Peter Schöffer, Mainz 1485) and the Latin herbal Hortus sanitatis (Jacobus Meydenbach, Mainz 1491), Herbarius moguntinus belongs to the so-called "Group of Mainz Herbal Incunabula."

Author 
The author of the book is not known for sure. By misinterpreting the title page of a reprint (Vicenza 1491), the book was wrongly attributed to Arnaldus de Villa Nova. As a possible but not secured author the Frankfurt physician Johann Wonnecke von Kaub is assumed.

Sources and content 
As primary sources the author of the Herbarius moguntinus used well-known medieval encyclopaedias, such as the Liber pandectarum medicinae omnia medicine simplicia continens of Matthaeus Silvaticus (14th c.) and the Speculum natural of Vincent of Beauvais (13th century).

The first part of the book consists of 150 chapters, in which plants are described, that grow wild or cultivated North of the Alps. Each chapter in the first part is illustrated by a woodcut of symbolic character. The second part shows 96 other medicines of indigenous and of foreign origin in abbreviated form. Pictures are missing in the second part.

Woodcuts in the Herbarius moguntinus. Mainz 1484

Editions and translations 
 Mainz. Peter Schöffer 1484.
 Speier. Anonymous 1484
 Leuven. Johann Veldener.  Herbarius in Dyetsche.  1484.
 Leuven. Johann Veldener 1485-86.
 Leipzig.  Markus Brand 1484. 
 Passau. Anonymous 1486.
 Passau. Anonymous 1486 (further edition).
 Paris. Anonymous 1486.
 Vicenza. Achates et Gul. Papia 1491.
 Venice. Bevilaqua (Simon Papia) 1499.
 Venice. Francesco Bindoni and Maffeo Pasini.  Herbolario volgare.  1536

Notes 

Herbals
1480s books